Centrjapyx is a genus of diplurans in the family Japygidae.

Species
 Centrjapyx mahunkorum Pagés, 1982
 Centrjapyx tristani (Silvestri, 1929)

References

Diplura